Wu'an Circuit was a circuit of China during the Tang dynasty.

It was formed by the expansion and renaming of the Qinhua Circuit.

See also
 Tang dynasty
 History of the administrative subdivisions of China

Tang dynasty